The great comet of 1472 was visible from Christmas Day 1471 to 1 March 1472 (Julian Calendar), for a total of 59 days.

The comet is notable because it was observed by 15th-century astronomers, during a time of rapid progress in planetary theory, shortly before the Copernican Revolution.
The comet was observed by Regiomontanus and Bernhard Walther from Nuremberg.
Regiomontanus tried to estimate its distance from Earth, using the parallax.
According to   Seargeant (2009):

An Italian physician named Angelo Cato de Supino also left a description of the comet, claiming it was as bright and majestic as the full moon, its tail extending over more than 30 degrees.
The comet (or  "broom star") was also observed in Chinese astronomy, where it is noted that it was visible even at midday.
The 15th century English Chronicler, Warkworth, left a detailed account of the comet's appearance and disappearance from the night sky of England.

See also
 Halley's Comet#1456
 Great Comet of 1556
 Great Comet of 1577

References

External links 
 Jane L. Jervis, Cometary Theory in Fifteenth-Century Europe (1985), 112ff.
 M. Celoria, "Comet of 1472", Nature, Vol. 316, NO.6024/JUL11 (1985), p. 107. 
 J. O. Halliwell, "On a very particular and curious Account of the Comet of 1472, from a contemporary MS. Chronicle in Peterhouse Library", The London and Edinburgh Philosophical Magazine and Journal of Science  vol. 14 (1839), 260f.
 J. O. Halliwell-Phillipps, "A chronicle of the first thirteen years of the reign of King Edward the Fourth by Warkworth, John, d. 1500"; University of Cambridge. Peterhouse. Library. Mss (230), 

1472